Barringtonia asiatica (fish poison tree, putat  or sea poison tree) is a species of Barringtonia native to mangrove habitats from islands of the Indian Ocean in the west to tropical Asia and islands of the western Pacific Ocean. It is grown along streets for decorative and shade purposes in some parts of India, for instance in some towns on the southeastern shore. It is also known as Box Fruit due to the distinct box-shaped fruit it produces. The local name futu is the source of the name for the Polynesian island Futuna. The type specimen was collected by botanist Pehr Osbeck on a sandy beach area on the island of Java, later to be described (and given the original name of Mammea asiatica) by Carl Linnaeus in his Species Plantarum in 1753 (and reassigned to the genus Barringtonia by Wilhelm Kurz in 1875).

Description
It is a small to medium-sized tree growing to 7–25 m tall. The leaves are narrow obovate, 20–40 cm in length and 10–20 cm in width. Fruit produced as mentioned earlier, is otherwise aptly known as the Box Fruit, due to distinct square like diagonals jutting out from the cross section of the fruit, given its semi spherical shape form from stem altering to a subpyramidal shape at its base. The fruit measures 9–11 cm in diameter, where a thick spongy fibrous layer covers the 4–5 cm diameter seed.

Ecology
The fruit is dispersed in the same way as a coconut – by ocean current – and is extremely water-resistant and buoyant. It can survive afloat for up to fifteen years; it was one of the first plants to colonise Anak Krakatau when this island first appeared after the Krakatau eruption. When washed ashore, and soaked by rainwater, the seeds germinate.

Human use
All parts of the tree are poisonous, the active poisons including saponins. Box fruits are potent enough to be used as a fish poison. The seeds are ground to a powder and used to stun or kill fish for easy capture, suffocating the fish while the flesh is unaffected.

Gallery

References

asiatica
Flora of tropical Asia
Flora of the Pacific
Flora of the Western Indian Ocean
Trees of Taiwan
Flora of the Zanzibar Archipelago
Flora of Queensland
Ericales of Australia
Plants described in 1753
Taxa named by Carl Linnaeus
Flora of the Northern Territory
Taxa named by Wilhelm Sulpiz Kurz
Poisonous plants